Valhalla is a large indoor dark flume ride at Blackpool Pleasure Beach in Lancashire, England. Opened on 14 June 2000 at a cost of £15 million, it is one of the longest indoor dark rides in the world at a duration of just over six minutes. Both a dark ride and a water ride, Valhalla uses special effects which incorporate fire, water and snow. Following a £4M refurbishment since 2019, the ride will re-open for technical rehearsals from 7th April 2023. 

More than 100,000 gallons of water are recycled per minute, and roughly 35,000 cubic feet of gas is used an hour to provide the flame effects.  The ride has a capacity of 2,000 per hour and each journey lasts approximatley six minutes covering almost half a mile. There are several drops.

Design 

Conceived by former park owner Geoffrey Thompson, the ride is based on Valhalla from Norse mythology and covers sixteen different scenes. The ride show, animations and effects were designed by a number of ride manufacturers from around the UK, France, and the USA. Intamin provided the water transit system.

Valhalla uses physical effects such as a dramatic change in temperature and artificial snow throughout the duration of the ride. Riders experience extremes of temperature ranging from −20 °C to 40 °C. There are various water effects during the ride course, including a water vortex and track elements include a turntable (where the boat is turned around thus facing backwards).

The ride has a capacity of 2,000 per hour and each journey lasts approximately six minutes covering almost half a mile. The front is covered with artificial rock effect (replaced in 2012) and a huge waterfall flows down the ride building facade, dispensing 12,000 gallons of water per minute.

After the 2001 season, the boats were replaced with brand new updated boats which included a redesigned cannon for the front of the boat and redesigned padded grabrails for the front row and curved metal grab rails for the back 3 rows. The old boats were shipped out to Parque Warner Madrid in Spain to be used on their brand new flume ride Río Bravo.

After the 2007 season, the boats were given new seats which included padded headrests and updated metal grabrails, and after the 2012 refurbishment, they were all given a new paint job.

Ride experience 2000-2019 

In the Viking-themed station hand built by a team of Russian carpenters, riders board a Viking-style longship. The ride boats can seat up to eight people. Despite the ride featuring several drops, the boats have no lap bars, only padded and metal grab rails. The boats can become filled with several inches of water and ride operators are usually seen with a pump removing excessive water in the floor from the boats as they pass through the station.

Viking chanting music, 'Song of the Elders', plays in the station and throughout the ride, although is not clearly audible in all parts.

Boats travel in the same way as a traditional log flume ride, carried on pumped flowing water. As the boat enters the ride building, a waterfall from the mouth is stopped via infrared sensor just as riders are about to pass through it, but occasionally will not stop, soaking riders. As the boat enters the building, a Viking warrior is seen in a cave in the wall (this used to be two crows). Once inside, a dog-like beast comes into view and to the right, a 2-headed dog appears from the shadows barking at the riders lit by a huge LED strobe light acting to guard the entrance to Valhalla.

Fire-lit torches give off heat as the boat passes under Fenrir climbing the lift hill. The rock tunnel surrounding the lift hill rotates with eerie sound and lighting, while a video projection of a Norse god intones via double-tracked vocals:

"Where lightning strikes to burn the soul. Where fires rage to ignite evil. Where the chill of ice freezes eternity. The kiss of death has tortured the lives of these Viking warriors. Their stricken souls await to accompany you through the twilight world of the gods. Where mist shrouds the human form. ENTER VALHALLA!"

There is a small drop which sends the boat hurtling into darkness before lights flash as you turn right with dragon heads and a large UV lit face, as the ride reaches the next corner a demon head raises up behind a hole in the wall. The boat then enters the famous "fauxfire" room (also known as steam room).  This is a corridor of simulated fire effects.
The boat then briefly enters an area where the outside is exposed and the theme park can be seen, the boat moves towards this window and gives the impression that it may not stop and go over the edge. The boat is then rotated clockwise approximately 90 degrees via a turntable begins to move quickly backwards into complete darkness and an eventual drop. A second turntable returns the boat to forward travel. Powerful wind effects are utilised during this rotation.

The boat then enters the ice room where large fans blasting winds at temperatures of around -20°C and artificial snow are faced, in the style of Fimbulwinter. Perspex figures, simulating skeleton warrior-style and tiger ice sculptures watch you pass by. The boat proceeds around this room and into darkness again where there is a sharp drop of some 60 feet and 70-degree incline. Around halfway down the drop there is a blanket of mist and lighting effects which lead the rider to believe that the ride is about to level off before it eventually plunges into water below. Right before the drop, riders can sometimes see a spiked log come into view before the bottom of the drop is visible, however, it is difficult at times to see this clearly. If riders are also quick enough on the drop, they will see a large longship wrecked on their right-hand side and the second drop to their left.

A tunnel of water jets is then passed through, which deposits considerable amounts of cold water over the boat, particularly for those sitting on the left hand side of the longship. The lights start flickering on and off as a water cannon to the right shoots water straight up into the air which comes down onto the boat. The lights flicker on to show you are going to pass under a water fall. As the lights go off, the waterfall stops and you pass under it turning around to start the climb of the second lift hill.

At the top of the hill, the rides pass under a swinging set of skulls with eerie eyes accompanied by distant screaming. Turning right past two giant Viking warriors, riders see a jungle-like setting where the boat encounters two gigantic log hammers which swoop down and appear to be heading to sandwich crush the boat but simply create a huge splash, further drenching those on board.

The boat then turns left where it passes under a rolling spiked log and the sounds of arrows passing over head which riders feel are just missing their heads. There are also fire-lit arrows in the walls to simulate this. The boat then passes into a dark area passing a skeleton with lit-up eyes and smoke coming off it into a dark room. A crow is lit up briefly, then another smoky skeleton is lit up with wind effects blowing it around which then says "Please do not lean forward on the next drop" twice (this used to be trees and bushes in a cage which simulated thunder and lightning with strobe lighting).

The boat then goes down a large double drop, plummeting into a ring of fire that is extinguished by the splash of water just in time before facing an inferno of longships visibly ablaze and temperatures briefly up to 40°C when fireballs are ejected. The fireball effects are achieved via the ignition of pressurised natural gas bursts from storage cylinders.

The boat then veers around to the left into a final explosive scene where a small fireball goes off to the left shortly followed by a huge fireball explosion to the right. The large fireball is widely suspected as being the most expensive effect on the entire ride. Then the boat sails out of the building where another cannon shoots a considerable amount of water into the air and back down onto the boat and unsuspecting bystanders offride before going back into the station.

History 

Valhalla opened in 2000. It replaced the Fun House, which burned down in 1991. It was opened by Jane Goldman along with her husband Jonathan Ross; Geoff Capes also appeared dressed as Hagar the Horrible. Regia Anglorum provided Vikings to support the event, and they provided boat (The Black Tern) that appeared in front of the ride for a number of years. This boat had appeared in Erik the Viking, the KLF America, What Time Is Love? video and episodes of Ivanhoe! for the BBC.

Upon opening, Valhalla won many themed attraction awards. Between 2015, 2018 & 2019, Valhalla has been named "Best Water Ride In The World" By The Amusement Today Golden Ticket Awards.

Valhalla reportedly has very high running costs given the complexity of the ride system and its effects, reaching £147,000 per month in peak season. It is claimed that the ride makes up a third of the park's total power demand.

During its early years, Valhalla featured further pyrotechnic effects such as 'lightning', explosions and flames. These have become reduced after a decade of operation.

In May 2004, a fire which damaged the Grand National rollercoaster and the Alice in Wonderland dark ride was extinguished using some of Valhalla's huge water content.

Valhalla was closed towards the end of the 2011 season to undergo its first major refurbishment. Notably, the façade structure was replaced in its entirety, including removal of the shop, a new exit, a replacement "faux-rock" facade and restoring the waterfall.

Inside, some changes were made to the effects and scenes. The Tesla coil lightning room was completely removed and replaced with 2 Viking skeletons, a large carved Valhalla sign and laser effects. The sound of lightning remains in this area. The ride music system was also improved for better coverage throughout the attraction. The ride re-opened on 5 May 2012. Two life-size faux-ice panther sculptures were later added to the ice room.

On 20 December 2019 Blackpool Pleasure Beach announced that Valhalla will remain closed for the duration of the 2020 season, the ride's 20th anniversary year. It was originally due to reopen for the 2021 season but was delayed due to the COVID-19 pandemic. It is now expected to re-open in 2023.

Music 
The main theme music used for the ride is a soundtrack known as "Song Of The Elders", originally composed by Grahame Maclean as the last segment of Rhythmos, the 2000 incarnation of the park's Hot Ice Show. The tune and scoring is taken from the Maori song "Tarakihi" (the locust).
This music is played very loudly in the ride station, and at some points during the ride.
It can be noted that the Valhalla music sounds different in each place around the ride – in the ride station it sounds raucous and loud whereas in some places throughout the ride is comes across as more distant and mysterious - probably to do with the positioning of the speakers.
The theme music used to be patchy throughout the ride, this was improved somewhat during the 2011/2012 refurbishment however since then the audio system has deteriorated to the point where it is "botched."  As a result, several of the sound effects are not functioning correctly, whilst others are inaudible due to being too quiet.
For the first two years of operation Valhalla had different theme music – the old piece can still be heard on the first lift hill.

Other sound effects throughout the ride include dogs barking, snow falling, thunder (this has since been removed), crows, screams and Odin on the first lift hill.  There is also a second piece of music that plays on the first lift hill, but only briefly.  This was previously the main theme for the ride.  Furthermore, two similar pieces of music (which could even be different sections from the same piece) can be heard upon both leaving and re-entering the ride's station.

References 

Blackpool Pleasure Beach
Water rides
Dark rides
Log flume rides
Amusement rides introduced in 2000